Howes is an unincorporated community in Meade County, South Dakota, United States. Although not tracked by the Census Bureau, Howes has been assigned the ZIP code of 57748.

References

Unincorporated communities in Meade County, South Dakota
Rapid City, South Dakota metropolitan area
Unincorporated communities in South Dakota